Rural Development Policy Institute is a not-for-profit organisation with an aim to "addressing  vulnerabilities of resource-poor rural communities in Pakistan." RDPI was established under Trust Act 1882 in Islamabad on 7 February 2003. A group of lawyers, researchers, journalists and development professionals hailing from rural areas of Punjab created a community of friends based in Islamabad. They decided to develop an institution dedicated to work in and with rural communities of Pakistan. The core objective of establishing such an organisation was to provide an interface between academia, policy makers and media to discuss, debate, research, advise, advocate and demonstrate in field the models of participatory and inclusive rural development which should enhance social, political and economic spaces for the marginalised communities with focus on riverine areas.

RDPI is a civil initiative, with an aim to stimulating public dialogue on politics, informing public action, and "activat(ing) social regrouping to celebrate capacities".

RDPI, as it is known, also takes up research, planning, training and advocacy to help build "appropriate and people-centered rural development" at the village, union council, tehsil and district levels in that part of South Asia.

RDPI defines development as a dynamic process, which enlarges human choices, ensures ecological balance and provides supportive climate so that human creativity may flourish. RDPI understands that appropriate and integrated rural development can positively be achieved by redistributing political power, diversifying the occupational base, enhancing livelihood options and providing necessary infra-structural and training support to socially dropped-out communities and economically left-behind areas.

RDPI campaigns for the redressal of grievances of the disentitled majority of rural communities by bringing about a shift in the structure of control and ownership of resources that should bring the disenfranchised back into the central flow of life.

The founders of RDPI include: Amjad Bhatti, Irfan Maqbool, Javaid Iqbal Malik, Iftikhar Haider, Aftab Alam, Kashif Hameed and Sohail Yaqoob Chishti.

Since 2003, RDPI has undertaken about 62 projects amounting Pak Rs 350 million; and has worked in 18 districts, 250 villages/communities in Punjab, Sindh, Khyber Pakhtunkhwa, Balochistan, Gilgit-Baltistan and Azad Jammu and Kashmir. Currently, RDPI is implementing
a major project in 132 communities, 73 villages, two union councils of districts Muzaffargarh and Rajanpur of Southern Punjab. The current project is supported by WHH.

The Board of Trustees of RDPI has undertaken a review of organisations functioning and introduced a Change Management Plan 2015-2016. The CMP is aimed at Institutional Re-profiling and Improved
Internal Governance of RDPI. The need for institutional re-profiling (Revamping) and improving internal governance was articulated
in a number of meetings and consultations of the BoT. To this effect, following three pillars of reforms were identified for the organisational restructuring of RDPI:
Thematic Refocus: Transform the organisation into a credible, authentic and effective think tank, research and resource organisation focussing on the development of rural areas and communities.
Internal Governance Reforms: Develop internal control systems and performance tracking mechanisms by introducing customised modules of Enterprise Resource Planning (ERP).
Self-resourcing Mechanisms: Establish RDPI’s subsidiaries (social enterprises) to generate resources to finance project(s), activities and expenditures of RDPI TRUST.

References 

Non-profit organisations based in Pakistan
Rural development in Pakistan